P.O. Box Unabomber (alternative title Praehidno) is a Bulgarian theatre play written by Zdrava Kamenova and Gergana Dimitrova. The play won "Ikar" award of the Union of Bulgarian Artists in 2012 for Best Bulgarian play of the year.

Themes 

The authors bring several elements into focus in their work; mainly the notions of Ted Kaczynski and his manifesto. They focus heavily on Kaczynski's position that technology seems to be corrupting, rather than advancing the human race. Played as a parallel against the destructive progression of technology is the journey of the now extinct western long-beaked echidna and its attempt to find it a mate like itself to prevent disappearing forever. The strong thematic ties between the two; man thinking he can disappear despite always being watched by satellites, and the creature thinking it will never disappear, despite being the last of its kind, are deeply thought provoking.

P.O. Box Unabomber is a play about the evolutionary dead-ends: humans’, animals’, nature's, society's. They are all around us and slowly die out and are being replaced. This is a play about the rapidly developing technologies, about self-satisfied scientists, about biological species on the edge of extinction, about a disintegrating family, about an environmental activist who tries to change the world but fails and remains just a common terrorist.

There are several intertangled plotlines but all of them are united by the attempts of the characters to be heard in a world that grows increasingly alienated from the simple things.

The characters have no faces, they are voices in the dark, they have no names, as if they are all lost in time and space without any chance of getting in touch with each other.

The action takes place in all directions:
 Inwards: a man suddenly disappears from his home and goes to the mountain alone, back to nature and back to his own substance. The police and his family are searching him.
 Outwards: a female-animal leaves its forest and goes beyond, into the human world to look for a male.
 Upwards: scientists are trying to build a cosmic elevator.
 Downwards: a satellite oversees everything and everybody on the Earth.

The play is a question: Can the system be changed by means of violence? Why is the oldest surviving mammal threatened with extinction? Why do people want to go farther and farther? Where does all that lead to?

P.O. Box Unabomber integrates quotations from Kaczynski's manifesto.

See also
 Industrial Society and Its Future – Kaczynski's manifesto

External links
 "P.O. Box Unabomber" trailer
 "P.O. Box Unabomber" photo session by Nikola Nalbantov

References

2011 plays
Bulgarian plays